María Vincente (born November 25, 1977 in Ramos Mejía, Buenos Aires) is an Argentine female volleyball player.

She was part of the Argentina women's national volleyball team at the 1999 FIVB Volleyball Women's World Cup, at the 2002 FIVB Volleyball Women's World Championship and 2003 FIVB Volleyball World Grand Prix.

Career
From 1990 to 1995, she played for Estudiantil Porteño; From 1996 to 1998, she played the Boca Juniors Club; in 1999 she played for Gimnasia y Esgrima de Buenos Aires, then Club Náutico Hacoaj and then Francia Club.
At club level she played for Velez Sarsfield.

References

External links
Women's World Cup 2003 - Match result

1977 births
Living people
Argentine women's volleyball players
People from Ramos Mejía
Sportspeople from Buenos Aires Province